The 1942 Wichita Shockers football team was an American football team that represented Wichita University (now known as Wichita State University) as an independent during the 1942 college football season. In their first season under head coach Ralph Graham, the Shockers compiled a 5–4 record, including its first victory over Kansas State since 1904, and outscored all opponents by a total of 125 to 106.

Schedule

References

Wichita
Wichita State Shockers football seasons
Wichita Shockers football